Ramesh Chandra Majhi  (born 9 April 1978) is an Indian politician. He was elected to the Lok Sabha, lower house of the Parliament of India from  Nabarangpur, Odisha in the 2019 Indian general election as a member of the Biju Janata Dal.  
He is Ex Cabinet Minister  for ST & SC Development, Minorities & Backward Classes Welfare, Panchyatraj Department in Government of Odisha.

Early life and education
Ramesh Chandra Majhi was born to Jadav Majhi and Balamati Majhi on 9 April 1978 in Dandamunda village under Chandahandi tehsil in Nabarangpur district. He has one brother and three sisters. Due to his involvement in politics at a very young age, the lack of attention to his study interrupted his higher studies and further education.
Even after holding the post of Minister of State (Ind) for Information & Technology, Majhi was not a graduate; he did not pass his +2 exams until April 2011. In 2011 he appeared for his +2(Arts) examination under the Council of Higher Secondary Education, Orissa.

Career
At the age of 20, Majhi became chairman of Chandahandi Block, at 25 Zilla Parishad member, at 27 youngest legislator of the State and 
at 31 Minister after being re-elected to the State Assembly.
 Entered Politics during the tenure of late Biju Patnaik
 Jan. 1997: Elected as Panchayat Samiti Member of "Dhodipani" Gram Panchayat under Chandahandi Block.
 Elected as chairman, Panchayat Samiti of Chandahandi, Dist.-Nabarangpur
 Elected as State Executive Member of B.J.D., Orissa
 Feb. 2002: Elected as Zilla Parishad Member of Chandahandi.

Assembly & Parliament Membership
 Member of Orissa Legislative Assembly from 2004 to 2009 (13th). Elected from Dabugam and contested from Biju Janata Dal party.
 Member of Orissa Legislative Assembly from 2009 to date (14th). Elected from Jharigam and contested from Biju Janata Dal party.
Loksabha
 Member of Parliament From 2019 Loksabha from Nabarangpur and contested from Biju Janata Dal Party

References

1978 births
Living people
Odisha politicians
India MPs 2019–present
Biju Janata Dal politicians